A subterranean waterfall or underground waterfall is a waterfall located underground, usually in a cave or mine.<ref  They are a common feature in cave systems where there are vertical or near vertical geological structures for the weathering process to exploit, and sufficient gradient between the sink and the rising. The highest known subterranean waterfall is in Vrtoglavica Cave in Slovenia, and is at least .

See also
 Waterfall
 Cavern
 Subterranean river
 Underground lake
 Subglacial lake

References

Subterranea (geography)
 
Karst formations
Dinaric karst formations